The 2004 Radivoj Korać Cup was the second season of the Serbian-Montenegrin men's national basketball cup tournament. The Žućko's left trophy awarded to the winner Crvena zvezda from Belgrade.

Venue

Qualified teams

Bracket

Source: Serbia Government

Qualifications

Quarterfinals

Semifinals

Final

References

External links 
 History of Radivoj Korać Cup

Radivoj Korać Cup (Serbia and Montenegro)
Radivoj
Serbia